Lavaca is a city in Sebastian County, Arkansas, United States. It is part of the Fort Smith, Arkansas-Oklahoma Metropolitan Statistical Area. As of the 2010 Census the population was 2,289.  Lavaca was incorporated in 1919.

Geography
Lavaca is located at  (35.336657, -94.176776).

Demographics

2020 census

As of the 2020 United States census, there were 2,450 people, 951 households, and 693 families residing in the city.

2000 census
As of the census of 2000, there were 1,825 people, 674 households, and 529 families residing in the city. The racial makeup of the city was 95.12% White, 0.16% Black or African American, 1.26% Native American, 1.21% from other races, and 2.25% from two or more races.  2.14% of the population were Hispanic or Latino of any race.

There were 674 households, out of which 41.5% had children under the age of 18 living with them, 65.6% were married couples living together, 9.8% had a female householder with no husband present, and 21.5% were non-families. 18.7% of all households were made up of individuals, and 6.1% had someone living alone who was 65 years of age or older.  The average household size was 2.71 and the average family size was 3.09.

In the city, the population was spread out, with 28.9% under the age of 18, 9.2% from 18 to 24, 34.6% from 25 to 44, 18.6% from 45 to 64, and 8.8% who were 65 years of age or older.  The median age was 33 years. For every 100 females, there were 92.9 males.  For every 100 females age 18 and over, there were 87.3 males.

The median income for a household in the city was $39,427, and the median income for a family was $43,542. Males had a median income of $28,684 versus $22,500 for females. The per capita income for the city was $15,917.  About 7.5% of families and 8.5% of the population were below the poverty line, including 11.2% of those under age 18 and 10.3% of those age 65 or over.

Education

Elementary and secondary education 
Public education for early childhood, elementary and secondary school students is provided primarily by the Lavaca School District, which leads to graduation from Lavaca High School. Lavaca High School was nationally recognized as a Bronze Medalist in the Best High Schools Report 2012 developed by U.S. News & World Report.

The district has undertaken construction projects to build a new school facilities for the high, middle and elementary schools. In 2010, the Lavaca Performing Arts Center was completed on the campus of Lavaca High School and is available to the city for community events.

Public libraries 
The Scott Sebastian Regional Library system based in Greenwood maintains the Lavaca Branch Library that contains books, magazines, newspapers and multimedia.

References

External links
City of Lavaca
 Encyclopedia of Arkansas History & Culture entry: Lavaca (Sebastian County)

Cities in Arkansas
Cities in Sebastian County, Arkansas
Fort Smith metropolitan area
Populated places established in 1919